Carlos Eduardo Muñoz Remolina (born 8 September 1959), popularly nicknamed "El Internacional" (The International), “El Pierna Fuerte” (The Strong Leg), “El Tigre Mayor” (The Chief Tiger), and “Carlitos", is a Mexican former professional footballer, who played as a midfielder and was also a member of the Mexico national team. Muñoz was the assistant manager at Tigres UANL for 11 years.

Personal life
His personal life is always in order and as an example, he was an Industrial Engineer and Christian, Carlos Reinoso has repeatedly expressed his gratitude to Muñoz, at a very difficult stage of his life, supported and persuaded him to become a Christian, which helped him much.

Playing career
Carlos Muñoz arrived at Tigres de la UANL  in the 1982-1983 season. He was considered one of the best midfielders in Mexico, and remained there until the arrival of Carlos de los Cobos, who began to take his place for the Mexico national team in 1995. A reference, a symbol, an icon, an asset, a franchise player, who defended the colors of Tigres de la UANL in all areas and all forms, Muñoz was respected by his peers and feared by his rivals.

Mexico
Muñoz began his international career playing in the 1981 FIFA World Youth Championship in Australia, where Mexico national team finished third in their group. Muñoz played in all three matches 0-1 West Germany national team, 1-1 Spain U-20 national team, and 3-3 Egypt U-20 national team).

Muñoz played in the 1986 FIFA World Cup for Mexico national team, facing Belgium national team and Paraguay national team in Group B. Muñoz also played in the Round of 16 match against Bulgaria national team where Mexico won 2-0. His last match of the World Cup was against West Germany national team where Mexico national team fell 4-1 in penalties in the quarter-finals.

Career statistics

International goals

Management career
After retiring as a player, he took up managing, becoming the assistant manager for Tigres de la UANL in 1998 and remaining there until 2009.

References

1959 births
Living people
1986 FIFA World Cup players
1991 CONCACAF Gold Cup players
San Luis F.C. players
Tigres UANL footballers
Liga MX players
Association football midfielders
Mexican football managers
Mexican footballers
Mexico international footballers